Article 371 (D)  forms a part of the Constitution of India. It was incorporated as the 32nd Amendment of the Constitution in 1973. It has become a bone of contention for the bifurcation of the state of Andhra Pradesh and Telangana.

References
Article 371 and 371 A-J

Article 371 Maharashtra and Gujrat.
371 A Nagaland
371 B Assam
371 C Manipur
371 D Andhra Pradesh and Telangana.
371 E Universities in Andhra Pradesh
371 F Sikkim
371 G Mizoram
371 H Arunachal Pradesh
371 I Goa
371 J Karnataka

External links

Articles of the Constitution of India
1974 in India
1974 in law